Archidona Canton is a canton of Ecuador, located in the Napo Province.  Its capital is the town of Archidona.  Its population at the 2001 census was 18,551.

References

Cantons of Napo Province